Surplus sharing is a kind of a fair division problem where the goal is to share the financial benefits of cooperation (the "economic surplus") among the cooperating agents. As an example, suppose there are several workers such that each worker i, when working alone, can gain some amount ui. When they all cooperate in a joint venture, the total gain is u1+...+un+s, where s>0. This s is called the surplus of cooperation, and the question is: what is a fair way to divide s among the n agents?

When the only available information is the ui, there are two main solutions:

 Equal sharing: each agent i gets ui+s/n, that is, each agent gets an equal share of the surplus.
 Proportional sharing: each agent i gets ui+(s*ui/Σui), that is, each agent gets a share of the surplus proportional to his external value (similar to the proportional rule in bankruptcy). In other words, ui is considered a measure of the agent's contribution to the joint venture.
Kolm calls the equal sharing "leftist" and the proportional sharing "rightist".

Chun presents a characterization of the proportional rule.

Moulin presents a characterization of the equal and proportional rule together by four axioms (in fact, any three of these axioms are sufficient): 

 Separability - the division of surplus within any coalition T should depend only on the total amount allocated to T, and on the opportunity costs of agents within T.
 No advantageous reallocation - no coalition can benefit from redistributing its ui among its members (this is a kind of strategyproofness axiom).
 Additivity - for each agent i, the allocation to i is a linear function of the total surplus s.
 Path independence - for each agent i, the allocation to i from surplus s is the same as allocating a part of s, updating the ui, and then allocating the remaining part of s.

Any pair of these axioms characterizes a different family of rules, which can be viewed as a compromise between equal and proportional sharing.

When there is information about the possible gains of sub-coalitions (e.g., it is known how much agents 1,2 can gain when they collaborate in separation from the other agents), other solutions become available, for example, the Shapley value.

See also 

 Bankruptcy problem - a similar problem in which the goal is to share losses (negative gains).
 Cost-sharing mechanism - a similar problem in which the goal is to share costs.
Frederic G. Mather, Both sides of profit sharing: an 1896 article about the need to share the surplus of work fairly between employees and employers.

References 

Fair division